Athrips spiraeae is a moth of the family Gelechiidae. It is found in Ukraine, Russia (southern Ural, Lower Volga and Altai) and Kazakhstan.

The larvae probably feed on Spiraea species.

References

Moths described in 1871
Athrips
Moths of Europe
Moths of Asia